Quad City Rollers (QCR) is a roller derby league based in Davenport, Iowa. Founded in 2006, the league currently consists of two adult teams, the All-Stars and the Mississippi Massacre, and a junior roller derby team, the Orphan Brigade. Quad City is a member of the Women's Flat Track Derby Association (WFTDA).

History and organization
The Quad City Rollers entered the WFTDA Apprentice Program in July 2011  and became a full member of the WFTDA in December 2013. The Quad City Rollers operate as a not-for-profit 501(c)3 organization and are skater-owned and -operated.

WFTDA rankings

References

Roller derby leagues established in 2006
Roller derby leagues in Iowa
Women's Flat Track Derby Association
2006 establishments in Iowa
Davenport, Iowa
Sports in the Quad Cities